Aladdin Records was a record company and label founded in Los Angeles in 1945 by brothers Eddie and Leo Mesner. It was originally called Philo Records before changing its name in 1946.

Aladdin was known for jazz, rhythm and blues, and rock music. Some of these were issued on the company's short-lived Jazz: West imprint. Aladdin Records launched several subsidiary labels such as Score (1948), Intro (1950), 7-11 (1952), Ultra (1955), Jazz: West (1955), and Lamp (1956). In addition to Los Angeles, many Aladdin recordings were produced by Cosimo Matassa in New Orleans.

Aladdin's first album was by Lester Young. Other musicians on the roster included Ernie Andrews, Charles Brown, Thurston Harris, Maxwell Davis, Al Hibbler,  Billie Holiday, Lynn Hope, Jimmy Liggins, Lightnin' Hopkins, Red Nelson ("Mother Fuyer"), and Illinois Jacquet. In 1961, Aladdin was sold to Imperial Records, which was acquired by Liberty Records. Capitol bought Liberty in 1969, and reissues appeared on Blue Note Records.

See also
 List of record labels
 Aladdin Records (UK)

References

External links
 Aladdin Records on the Internet Archive's Great 78 Project

American record labels
Jazz record labels
Rhythm and blues record labels
Rock and roll record labels
Soul music record labels
Record labels based in California
Defunct record labels of the United States
Defunct companies based in Greater Los Angeles
Record labels established in 1945
Record labels disestablished in 1961
1945 establishments in California
1961 disestablishments in California